Menster Ledge is a relatively level benchlike feature which rises to   southwest of Mount Olympus in Hughes Basin, Britannia Range, Antarctica. It was named after Chaplain William Menster (Commander, U.S. Navy) of the flagship  in Operation Highjump, 1946–47. The location of the ledge is in proximity to Byrd Glacier, Mount Olympus, and other features that memorialize leaders and ships of Operation Highjump.

References

Ridges of Oates Land